Wayne Leroy Stevens (June 19, 1936 – January 23, 2021) was an American professional basketball player.

Biography
Stevens was born in Chillicothe, Ohio, and attended Chillicothe High School, where he was a three-time All-Central Ohio League selection in basketball. As a junior in 1952–53, he was named Class A (big-school) second-team all-state by the Associated Press (AP). As a senior in 1953–54, he was again named second-team all-state, along with future basketball hall-of-famer Wayne Embry and baseball hall-of-famer Bill Mazeroski. In track, he was also the state high-jump champion.

Stevens played college basketball for coach George Smith at the University of Cincinnati. As a sophomore starting forward in 1955–56, Stevens scored 10.3 points per game and grabbed a team-leading 13.9 rebounds per game for the 17-7 Bearcats.

As a junior in 1956–57, Stevens averaged 13.0 points and 11.3 rebounds per game, both second on the team behind center Connie Dierking, for the 15-9 Bearcats.
 
As a senior in 1957–58, third-year starter Stevens and Dierking served as co-captains and Stevens averaged 10.7 points and 5.1 rebounds per game. The Bearcats, who welcomed sophomore starters Oscar Robertson and Ralph Davis to the team, went 25-3 and won the Missouri Valley Conference (MVC) and advanced to the NCAA Tournament, where, in the Midwest Regional, they fell to Kansas State in overtime before defeating Arkansas.

Stevens was selected in the seventh round (49th overall) of the 1958 NBA draft by the Cincinnati Royals. He played in eight games for the Royals during the beginning of the 1959–60 NBA season, and averaging 1.6 points and 2.0 rebounds per game.

Stevens died on January 23, 2021, in Ocala, Florida.

References

1936 births
2021 deaths
American men's basketball players
Basketball players from Ohio
Cincinnati Bearcats men's basketball players
Cincinnati Royals draft picks
Cincinnati Royals players
Small forwards
Sportspeople from Chillicothe, Ohio